Bruce Appleyard (born July 2, 1965) is an American city planner and urban designer, theorist, consultant, academic, and author. He works as a Professor of City Planning for San Diego State University in the School of Public Affairs. He has authored articles in the emerging field of Livability Ethics. He is the son of Donald Appleyard, a British-born American urban and city planner.

Academia
Appleyard earned his BA in geography from UC Berkeley in 1989, and a Masters in City & Regional Planning from UC Berkeley.  He holds a PhD in City & Regional Planning from UC Berkeley also. He is currently an Associate professor at San Diego State University, which he joined in 2013. Appleyard has co-authored the text book The Transportation/Land Use Connection and written scholarly articles & abstracts published in professional journals and edited volumes.

In 2014, Appleyard and colleagues received a grant from HUD, DOT, and EPA to develop a "Livability Calculator" based on research from more than 350 transportation corridors throughout the United States. The Livability Calculator is a tool to help City Planning Professionals integrate the best planning practices of transport and land-use, access to opportunities, and social equity. Appleyard believes that by improving access to opportunities, people may improve the quality of their lives.

Awards
 2006 Top-Ten Active Living Heroes by the Robert Wood Johnson Foundation, alongside Dan Burden and then-Senator Barack Obama.  This was for work with communities to improve their livability, safety, and health.

References

1965 births
Living people
American urban planners
UC Berkeley College of Environmental Design alumni
San Diego State University faculty
UC Berkeley College of Letters and Science alumni